The wildlife of France can be divided into that of Metropolitan France, and that of the French Overseas territories. For more information, see:
 Fauna of Metropolitan France
 Flora of Metropolitan France
 Fungi of Metropolitan France
 Wildlife of French Guiana
 Wildlife of French Polynesia
 Wildlife of Martinique
 Wildlife of Réunion
 Wildlife of Guadeloupe
 Wildlife of Mayotte

See also 
 Outline of France
 Glorioso Islands Marine Natural Park
 Gironde estuary and Pertuis sea Marine Nature Park
 Iroise Sea
 Mayotte Marine Natural Park
 Natural Park of the Coral Sea

External links 
 

France
Biota of France